The Semenic-Caraș Gorge National Park is a protected area (national park category II IUCN) situated in southwest Romania, in Caraș-Severin County.

Location
It is situated in the southwestern part of Romania, in the middle of Caraș-Severin County.

Description
The Semenic-Caraș Gorge National Park was declared a protected area by Law No. 5 of 6 March 2000 (published in Monitorul Oficial No. 152 on 12 April 2000).  It features a typical karst and forest landscape and is characterised by its 300-year-old virgin beech forest, the only one in Europe.

The Park contains a number of nature reserves, including the Caraș Gorge (Cheile Carașului), the Caraș Springs (Izvoarele Carașului), and dripstone and other caves.

The Caraș Gorge is one of Romania’s longest, wildest and most beautiful, with rich flora and fauna, including the Semenic flower (Anntenaria dioica). It has many caves, some only accessible from underwater, with near-vertical limestone walls and so-called “kettles” on the upper  Caraș. On the right bank of the Caraș, above the Caraș Gorge, are the ruins of the thirteenth-century Grat Castle. One of the most beautiful caves in this area, with diverse formations of stalactites and stalagmites, is the dripstone cave of Comarnic.

Twenty archaeological sites have been discovered in the Park.

Access 
 European route E70-București – Craiova – Drobeta-Turnu Severin – Orșova – Topleț – National road DN6 – Mehadia

References 

National parks of Romania
Geography of Caraș-Severin County
Protected areas established in 2000
Tourist attractions in Caraș-Severin County
Primeval Beech Forests in Europe